Joss Christopher Labadie (born 30 August 1990) is an English footballer who plays as a midfielder for Walsall.

Career

Early career
Born in Croydon, Labadie began his football career with West Bromwich Albion. He joined their academy in 2006 after being spotted playing for Barking Abbey College of Sport and being invited for a trial. In the 2007–08 season, he played 19 times for Albion's reserve team, scoring three times. This earned him his first professional contract in the summer of 2008, on a one-year deal with the option of a second season.

Before he was able to break into the Albion first team, he was sent on loan to League Two side Shrewsbury Town on 1 January 2009. He played for Shrewsbury two days later in a league match against Bradford City at Valley Parade, in a game which finished 0–0. He subsequently fractured his foot in training and returned to West Brom less than a week after he had left the club. He returned to Shrewsbury on an initial month-long loan on 3 August. He made his first appearance of the 2009–10 season in a 3–1 victory over Burton Albion, during which he scored a free kick from 30 yards. After extending his loan spell until January, Labadie scored on 12 September 2009, in a 2–0 win over Crewe Alexandra. After adding three more goals against Northampton Town, Cheltenham Town and Morecambe, where he was sent-off during the match, Labadie returned to West Brom in November, with Shrewsbury manager Paul Simpson saying, "I've been disappointed with his recent attitude."

Later the same year, Labadie had another loan spell in League Two, this time with Cheltenham Town. He made his Cheltenham Town debut on 21 November 2009, where he started the whole game, in a 1–0 loss against Morecambe. A handful of first-team appearances led Labadie to have his loan spell extended on two occasions, all the way to February. He made eleven appearances for the side before returning to his parent club in February.

West Brom released Labadie on 14 May 2010.

Tranmere Rovers
On 24 March 2010, Labadie signed for Tranmere Rovers on loan until the end of the 2009–10 season. He made his club debut during a 3–0 defeat to Brighton & Hove Albion. He did not score his first goal until 17 April 2010 in a 3–1 win over Exeter City. He scored again in a 2–1 loss against Brentford three days later. Labadie also scored against Stockport County in the last game of the season. Tranmere Rovers survived relegation by one point.

On learning of his release from West Bromwich Albion at the end of the 2009–10 season, the club immediately made a contract offer to Labadie. On 20 May 2010 he signed a two-year contract with Tranmere. Since joining the club on a permanent basis, Labadie was a first team regular, although he was plagued by injuries, He was sent-off for violent conduct during a 1–0 win over Notts County on 20 November 2010. After serving a two-match suspension, Labadie scored on his return against Rochdale on 1 January 2011 despite losing 3–2. However, during a 2–0 loss against Milton Keynes Dons on 15 January 2011, he was booked for "simulation" or diving in the first half. Manager Les Parry insisted that he is not a cheat. Despite this, he scored again in a 2–1 loss against Brentford on 22 February 2011. After serving his suspension on two occasions, Labadie, nevertheless, made the total of 37 appearances and scored twice in his first permanent season at the club.

In the 2011–12 season, Labadie started the season well when he scored two goals against Notts County and Sheffield United He then scored two goals against Stevenage and Bury. However, Labadie's first team opportunities were soon limited. He was on the substitute bench with a foot injury. Despite this, he scored again on 24 March 2012, in a 2–0 win over Exeter City. After the match, Manager Ronnie Moore commented on Labadie's performance: "Joss took his opportunity well." After finishing his second season, making a total of 31 appearances and scoring five times in all competitions, Tranmere Rovers released him at the end of the 2011–12 season.

Notts County
On 9 July 2012, Labadie signed a one-year contract with Notts County.

He made his competitive debut for the club in the first round of the League Cup against Bradford City. He played his first league game in a 2–1 win over Crewe Alexandra coming on as a substitute in the first half to replace the injured Tom Williams. He scored his first goal for the club in a 2–2 draw away at Oldham Athletic. However, he soon found himself out of the first team and appeared on the substitute bench. After returning from a loan spell at Torquay United, he scored the only goal with a 35-yard free kick in a 1–0 win away at Doncaster Rovers, resulting him being named Team of the Week. After making a total of 28 appearances and scoring twice, Notts County announced on 1 May 2013 that he had been offered a contract extension. Ahead of the 2013–14 season, Labadie signed a one-year contract extension, keeping him until 2014.

Labadie appeared in the first team at the beginning of the season despite the club's poor start to the season. He then scored on 21 September 2013, in a 2–0 win over  the Tranmere Rovers. As a result, he was awarded for September's Goal of the Month. However, his first team chance was soon limited by his suspension.

Torquay United
After being unable to break into the Notts County first team Labadie joined Torquay for the remainder of the 2012–13 season. He scored his first goal for Torquay in a 2–2 draw with Dagenham and Redbridge. Four days later he scored his second goal in a 1–1 draw with Southend United. After adding another goal against Chesterfield, He scored again on 1 April 2013, in a 3–1 loss against Bradford City, in what turned out to be his last appearance for the side. He was recalled from his loan at Torquay on 5 April, after scoring four goals in seven appearances for the club.

On 3 January 2014, Labadie re-joined Torquay United on loan until 30 January 2014. On 31 January 2014, his contract with Notts County was terminated by mutual consent, and he signed a contract until the end of the season with Torquay United. Just three weeks into his contract, The FA announced that it was investigating an alleged biting incident in the Football League Two game against Chesterfield on 15 February 2014. A number of Chesterfield players claimed they were bitten by a then unnamed player during the game. On 4 March, the FA announced that Labadie had been charged with misconduct for an incident in the 49th minute of the game. Three days later Torquay and their manager, Chris Hargreaves, announced they were contesting the charge. On 12 March, The FA announced that a commission had found Labadie guilty of biting Ollie Banks. It banned Labadie for ten games and fined him £2,000 for the incident. The ban mirrored punishment given to Luis Suárez for a similar incident in April 2013. The day before the charges were announced, Labadie scored in a 2–1 win over Rochdale. The ban took him through to the end of the season when manager Hargreaves told the press that it was unlikely that Labadie would be offered a new contract after the club's relegation to non-league.

Dagenham & Redbridge
After being released by Torquay, Labadie signed for Dagenham & Redbridge on 8 July 2014 on a two-year contract.

Labadie made his Dagenham & Redbridge debut in the first round of the League Cup against Brentford, where he played 86 minutes. The club lost 4–2 on penalty shootout following a 6–6 draw through 120 minutes. He then made his league debut for the club, where he played 18 minutes after coming on as a substitute, in a 2–1 loss against Burton Albion. He scored his first goals for the club on 27 September 2014, in a 2–0 win over York City. Although he suffered a hamstring injury, Labadie found himself in and out of the first team. In April 2015 he was banned for six months after being found guilty of biting an opponent in a game on 21 March 2015 against Stevenage. Late in the ill-tempered game, Labadie had challenged Stevenage player, Ronnie Henry. The bite occurred after Labadie failed to release the ball after it had gone out for a throw-in. In his first season at Dagenham & Redbridge, Labadie went on to make a total of 27 appearances, scoring twice.

At the start of the 2015–16 season, Labadie remained out of the first team, having served just four months of his suspension. On 20 October 2015, he finally made his first appearance, coming on as a late substitute, in a 2–2 draw against York City. He scored his first goal of the season in a 1–1 draw against Plymouth Argyle on 28 November 2015. In the absence of Andre Boucaud, Labadie was his stand-in captain during the 2015–16 season. Labadie scored two goals in two matches between 28 December 2015 and 1 January 2016, both winning against Stevenage and Exeter City. Despite being sidelined over suspension and injury on two occasions later in the season, Labadie scored again on 5 April 2016, as well as assisting another goal, in a 2–1 win over Morecambe. Following the club's relegation to the non-league at the end of the 2016–17 season, Labadie made a total of 34 appearances and scored five times. The team's season ticket holders awarded Labadie Player of the Season.

However, Labadie was released by the club when his contract expired.

Newport County
On 7 June 2016, Labadie signed a two-year deal with Newport County.

Labadie scored on his debut for Newport on 6 August 2016 versus Mansfield Town in the opening game of the season, which Mansfield won 3–2. After making his debut for the club, Labadie quickly became a first team regular until he suffered an injury during a 2–0 loss against Doncaster Rovers on 17 September 2016. After being sidelined for three months, he returned to the first team in early December. Labadie scored again in a 3–1 loss against Crawley Town on 17 December 2016. However, his return was short-lived when he suffered a knee injury in a 1–0 loss against Plymouth Argyle in the FA Cup Campaign.

Labadie made his return to the first team, in a 4–0 defeat to Leyton Orient on 4 March 2017. In a follow- up against Crewe Alexandra, Labadie scored again on 11 March 2017, in a 2–1 win. However, he was sent-off for an off-the-ball altercation  with Crawley Town's Josh Yorwerth, who was also sent-off, in a 1–0 win on 1 April 2017, and served a three-match suspension, Towards the end of the season, with the club facing relegation to the non-league, Labadie captained for the side as a stand in for Scot Bennett and David Pipe. Labadie was part of the Newport squad that completed the 'Great Escape' with a 2–1 victory at home to Notts County on the final day of the 2016–17 season, which ensured Newport's survival in League Two. In his first season at the club, Labadie made a total of 22 appearances, scoring three times.

Ahead of the 2017–18 season, Labadie succeeded Bennett as the new captain. He had an operation on his wrist at the end of the 2016–17 season. Labadie switched his shirt from number 6 to 4. In the opening game of the season, he set up one of the goals, in a 3–3 draw against Stevenage. Several weeks later, on 22 August 2017, he scored his first goal of the season, in a 5–1 loss against Leeds United in the second round of League Cup. After suffering a groin injury, he scored two goals in two matches between 30 September 2017 and 7 October 2017 against Luton Town and Yeovil Town. However, Labadie, once again, suffered a groin injury for the second time during the season. On 10 March 2017 Labadie suffered a cruciate ligament injury against Yeovil Town that ruled him out for the remainder of the 2017–18 season. Labadie declined a new contract with Newport at the end of the 2017–18 season and he became a free agent whilst still recovering from the cruciate injury. On 23 October 2018 Labadie re-signed for Newport until the end of the 2018–19 season. He was part of the team that reached the League Two playoff final at Wembley Stadium on 25 May 2019. Newport lost to Tranmere Rovers, 1-0 after a goal in the 119th minute. In July 2019 Labadie signed a further two-year contract extension with Newport county. Labadie played for Newport in the League Two playoff final at Wembley Stadium on 31 May 2021 which Newport lost to Morecambe, 1-0 after a 107th minute penalty.

Walsall

On 12 June 2021, Labadie joined Walsall on a two-year contract.

At the beginning of the 2021-22 season Labadie was made captain for the campaign. Labadie made his Walsall debut on 7 August 2021 versus Tranmere, which they lost 1-0.

Career statistics

References

External links
 

1990 births
Living people
Association football midfielders
Black British sportspeople
Cheltenham Town F.C. players
Dagenham & Redbridge F.C. players
English Football League players
English footballers
Newport County A.F.C. players
Notts County F.C. players
Footballers from Croydon
Shrewsbury Town F.C. players
Torquay United F.C. players
Tranmere Rovers F.C. players
West Bromwich Albion F.C. players
Walsall F.C. players